Binhai North railway station is a railway station on the Tianjin–Qinhuangdao high-speed railway in Binhai New Area, Tianjin.

The Tianjin–Shanhaiguan railway passes close to this station, but does not stop here.

Railway stations in Tianjin
Railway stations in China opened in 2013
Stations on the Tianjin–Qinhuangdao High-Speed Railway